Ján Cifra (born 21 October 1955) is a Slovak volleyball player. He competed in the men's tournament at the 1980 Summer Olympics.

References

1955 births
Living people
Slovak men's volleyball players
Olympic volleyball players of Czechoslovakia
Volleyball players at the 1980 Summer Olympics
Sportspeople from Topoľčany